Granya is a town in northeastern Victoria, Australia on the Murray arm of Lake Hume in the Towong Shire local government area,  northwest of the state capital, Melbourne. 

The town was established in the 1860s following a gold rush.

References

Populated places on the Murray River
Towns in Victoria (Australia)
Shire of Towong